Achim Vogt (born 7 December 1970) is a Liechtensteiner former alpine skier who competed in the 1992 Winter Olympics, 1994 Winter Olympics, 1998 Winter Olympics, and 2002 Winter Olympics. He scored one win on the alpine skiing World Cup, in a giant slalom race in Tignes in December 1994.

References

External links
 sports-reference.com

1970 births
Living people
Liechtenstein male alpine skiers
Olympic alpine skiers of Liechtenstein
Alpine skiers at the 1992 Winter Olympics
Alpine skiers at the 1994 Winter Olympics
Alpine skiers at the 1998 Winter Olympics
Alpine skiers at the 2002 Winter Olympics